Spring Creek Township is the name of two places in the U.S. state of Minnesota:
Spring Creek Township, Becker County, Minnesota
Spring Creek Township, Norman County, Minnesota

Minnesota township disambiguation pages